Bokada Airport  is an airport serving the village of Bokada in Équateur Province, Democratic Republic of the Congo.

See also

 List of airports in the Democratic Republic of the Congo

References

 OurAirports - Bokada
 Bokada

Airports in the Nord-Ubangi Province